China National Highway 303 (G303) runs from Ji'an, Jilin to Xilinhot, Inner Mongolia. It is 1,263 kilometres in length and runs northwest from Ji'an through Jilin and Liaoning and ends in Inner Mongolia.

Route and distance

See also
 China National Highways

External links
Official website of Ministry of Transport of PRC

303
Transport in Liaoning
Transport in Jilin
Transport in Inner Mongolia